The Australian National Kennel Council is the coordinating kennel club of Australia. It is a member of the Fédération Cynologique Internationale.

Role
The Australian National Kennel Council is the peak body for Australia's state-based kennel clubs, which are:
 Australian Capital Territory Canine Association Inc (Dogs ACT)
 Canine Association of Western Australia Inc (Dogs West)
 Canine Control Council (Queensland) (Dogs Qld)
 North Australian Canine Association Inc (Dogs NT)
 Royal New South Wales Canine Council Ltd (Dogs NSW)
 South Australia Canine Association Inc  (Dogs SA)
 Tasmanian Canine Association Inc (Dogs Tas)
 Victorian Canine Association Inc (Dogs Vic)

It maintains stud books for recognised dog breeds, and provides governance for dog shows, dog trials and canine events. It is a member of the Fédération Cynologique Internationale, and the international representative of the kennel clubs of Australia.

History
The first meeting to consider forming the Australian National Kennel Council occurred in April 1949 during that year's Sydney Royal Easter Show. It was not until April 1958 that a constitution was drafted and presented at the Royal Easter Show, with it being approved and the council forming in September that year at the Royal Melbourne Show.

See also
List of kennel clubs

References

External links

Further reading
 Australian National Kennel Council, An Historical record of Australian kennel controls Melbourne: Australian National Kennel Council, 1988, .

Organizations established in 1958
Fédération Cynologique Internationale
Kennel clubs
Animal welfare organisations based in Australia
Dog breed registries
1958 establishments in Australia